The 2016 Rally Australia (formally the 25. Kennards Hire Rally Australia 2016) was the thirteenth and final round of the 2016 World Rally Championship. The race was held over four days between 17 November and 20 November 2016, and was based in Coffs Harbour, New South Wales, Australia. Volkswagen's Andreas Mikkelsen won the race, his third win in the World Rally Championship.

Entry list

Overall standings

Special stages

Power Stage
The "Power stage" was a  stage at the end of the rally.

References

Australia
Rally Australia
Rally